William Henry Smith (December 1, 1833 – July 27, 1896) was a newspaper editor, Republican politician who was Ohio Secretary of State 1865–1868, consolidated and managed the Associated Press, and was a compiler and editor of several historic works.

Biography
William Henry Smith was born December 1, 1833 at Columbia County, New York. In 1836 his parents moved to Ohio, where he received the best educational advantages the state afforded. He was a tutor, editor of the Literary Review at Cincinnati, and was an editor at the Cincinnati Gazette when the American Civil War broke out. He was active in promoting enlistments for the Union.

Smith was active in securing the gubernatorial nomination for John Brough, and became his private secretary upon his election to Governor in 1863. In 1864 he resigned when nominated by the Republicans for Ohio Secretary of State, and defeated incumbent Democrat William W. Armstrong in the general election. He was nominated again in 1866, and defeated Democrat Benjamin Le Fevre.

Smith resigned as Secretary January 14, 1868 to run the Cincinnati Chronicle for a short time until failing health caused his resignation. In 1870 he took charge of the Western Associated Press in Chicago. In 1877, President Hayes appointed him Collector of the Port of Chicago. In January, 1883, he led the merger of the Western Associated Press and the New York Associated Press, and was General Manager of the company.

Smith also compiled and edited historic works, including the St. Clair Papers in 1882. He died July 27, 1896 in Lake Forest, Illinois, and was interred at Lake Forest Cemetery.

Works

Notes

References

1896 deaths
1833 births
Politicians from Cincinnati
19th-century American newspaper publishers (people)
Ohio Republicans
Secretaries of State of Ohio
Associated Press people
19th-century American journalists
American male journalists
19th-century American male writers
19th-century American politicians
Burials at Lake Forest Cemetery
Illinois Republicans